Swiss UAV AG was a privately owned company based in Switzerland that designed and manufactured unmanned aerial vehicles (drones). The firm developed, produced & sold vertical take-off & landing vehicles from 2006 to 2014. It entered a partnership with Saab in May 2009. In 2013 the firm was acquired by Unmanned Systems AG and the following year merged into UMS Aero Group alongside Swedish company Unmanned Systems AB. 
At the end of 2015 UMS Aero Group became the majority partner in UMS Skeldar, a joint venture with Saab, manufacturers of the Skeldar unmanned vehicle.

References

External links
 .
 .

Saab aircraft
2000s Swiss aircraft
Unmanned aerial vehicle manufacturers
2006 establishments in Switzerland
Swiss companies established in 2006
Privately held companies of Switzerland